Sestola is a comune (municipality) situated in the Province of Modena in the Italian region Emilia-Romagna, located about  southwest of Bologna and about  southwest of Modena.   It is located near the Monte Cimone and other mountains of the northern Apennines separating Emilia and Tuscany.

Sestola borders the following municipalities: Fanano, Fiumalbo, Lizzano in Belvedere, Montecreto, Montese, Pavullo nel Frignano, Riolunato.

Main sights 
Fortress, rebuilt in the 16th century but dating to several centuries before.
Giardino Botanico Alpino "Esperia"
San Nicola di Bari church

See also
San Giovanni Battista, Roncoscaglia

References

External links
 Official website

Cities and towns in Emilia-Romagna